Plestiodon finitimus, the Far Eastern skink, is a species of lizard which is endemic to Japan and Russia.

References

finitimus
Reptiles of Japan
Reptiles described in 2012
Taxa named by Tsutomu Hikida